St Clair Leacock is a Vincentian politician. He is an opposition parliament member in Saint Vincent and the Grenadines. Leacock is also the New Democratic Party Central Kingstown candidate for 2020 Vincentian general election.

In 2000, Leacock was President of the Employers' Federation in St. Vincent and the Grenadines

Political career 

In 2010, Leacock joined the New Democratic Party. In the 13 December 2010 general election Leacock contested and ran for Central Kingstown and was elected to the House of Assembly as member of the opposition in Saint Vincent and the Grenadines after winning 54.09% of the vote. His party was unable to get in government but he was able to win his seat in Parliament.

In the 2015 election, Leacock was once again elected to the House of Assembly after winning his seat for Central Kingstown. He and his party colleagues claim that the election was stolen, and his party is currently in the process of a court case willing to get in government.

References

External links
 St Clair Leacock

Living people
New Democratic Party (Saint Vincent and the Grenadines) politicians
Members of the House of Assembly of Saint Vincent and the Grenadines
Year of birth missing (living people)